Wild at Heart: Discovering the Secret of a Man's Soul is a book by John Eldredge published in 2001, on the subject of the role of masculinity in contemporary evangelical Christian culture and doctrine. From the back cover: "In Wild at Heart, John Eldredge invites men to recover their masculine heart, defined in the image of a passionate God."

Eldredge claims that men are bored; they fear risk, they refuse to pay attention to their deepest desires. He challenges Christian men to return to what he characterizes as authentic masculinity without resorting to a "macho man" mentality. Men often seek validation in venues such as work, or in the conquest of women, Eldredge observes. He urges men to take time out and come to grips with the desires of their hearts. Eldredge frames the book around his outdoor experiences and anecdotes about his family and references elements of pop culture such as the film Braveheart and lyrics from songs.

Contents

Movement One: Reflecting God and the Masculine Question 
Wild at Heart is split into three sections, called "movements." The first argues that every aspect of a man, from his desires to who he is as a man, reflects God. Eldredge argues that the reason a man has the desires that he does and the reason why he is masculine is because he is, ultimately, an image-bearer of God. 

According to Eldredge, men reflect God uniquely in this way: they demonstrate God's ability to "come through" for his people. Men are made to "come through." Eldredge asserts that all man carry a deep question that is uniquely a masculine question. The question goes like this: "Do I have what it takes?"

Movement Two: The Poser, the Wound, and the Healing 
In the second movement, Eldredge asserts that all men carry a wound that hits men in the area of their deep question. He asserts that all men create a false self by which they display themselves to the world at large. This false self, or identity, feigns strength and courage while hiding cowardice and fear. Eldredge calls this false self The Poser. Eldredge says that when men are wounded in they typically go to two extremes or some combination of the two: angry men or passive men. "Look around our churches and ask, 'What is the typical Christian man like?' The answer is usually bored, angry, or passive." The first and deepest wound for most men, according to Eldredge, comes by way of the father.

Eldredge says that the answer to a man's question and the healing of their wound can only be found in Jesus. Eldredge describes the journey of healing and restoration that God wants to take every man on so that they can begin to live life the way he intended for them: free and from their restored masculine heart.

Movement Three: The Core Desires of a Man's Heart 
According to Eldredge, men have three core desires: battle, adventure, beauty.

The first desire is for a "battle to fight." Eldredge says that deep in the heart of every man is a warrior. He rejects the notion that men are crass, abusive, and violent. But what he does push for is a "fierceness" and "courage" that is the heart of a warrior--the ability to stand and fight for something. Eldredge says that for a man to be complete he must be fighting for something.

The second desire is for an "adventure to live." Eldredge points to the desire that most men have for exploration, creation, and adventure as uniquely masculine and a reflection of the heart of God. A man wants to be taken on a grand adventure and this is the invitation of the Gospel, says Eldredge. He points to many figures in Scripture such as Abraham, Jacob, Moses, and David who, when partnered with the call and will of God, were called on spectacular adventures.

The third desire is for a "beauty to rescue." Eldredge does not advocate male superiority or attempts to teach that women want or need to be subjugated by men. What he does point out is that in almost every story worth telling there is a beauty that needs rescuing in some fashion, whether it is from a dragon or a wicked stepmother or whether it is from fear and hopelessness. He makes it clear that, like men, women have three core desires also, but a man cannot answer her question. Eldredge moves beyond the notion that the Beauty equals a woman. Beauty can be found in nature, music, story, art, and ultimately in relationship with God. According to Eldredge, a man must become a "poet" in this regard--enjoying beauty outside of a woman--before he pursues a woman. 

Along the way, Eldredge constantly reminds his readers that only God can ultimately fulfill these three desires and the only reason a man has these three desires is because they are a reflection of the heart of God. Everything in Wild At Heart points to God as the center for life, fulfillment, and purpose, according to Eldredge.

Related works 
In 2005 Eldredge with his wife Stasi wrote Captivating, a companion to Wild at Heart, which explores femininity.

References

External links
Wild at Heart at publisher Thomas Nelson's website
Byron Borger's critique at Hearts & Minds Books
Rut Etheridge's Critique  of Wild at Heart
Is God Wild at Heart? Critical Review of Wild at Heart from the Council on Biblical Manhood and Womanhood
An article at Christianity Today documenting some criticism of the book

2001 non-fiction books
Books about Christianity
Men's movement in the United States
Thomas Nelson (publisher) books